Tărcaia is a commune in Bihor County, Crișana, Romania with a population of 1,969 people. It is composed of four villages: Mierag (Mérág), Tărcaia, Tărcăița (Tárkányka) and Totoreni (Tatárfalva).

Geography
Tărcaia lies along the river bank of the Crișul Negru in the southeastern part of Bihor County,
around 65 km south-east of Oradea and 4 km south of Beiuș.

Ethnic groups
According to the 2002 census, the ethnic structure is 53.89% Hungarians with a population of 1161, 45.91% Romanians with a population of 989. There is also a small community of Ukrainians and Germans, respectively 0.13% and 0.04%.

References

Communes in Bihor County
Localities in Crișana